Wesley Koolhof and Matwé Middelkoop were the defending champions but chose not to participate.

Sanchai and Sonchat Ratiwatana won the title after defeating Sadio Doumbia and Fabien Reboul 7–6(7–4), 7–5 in the final.

Seeds

Draw

References
 Main Draw

Doubles
Bangkok Challenger II - Doubles
 in Thai tennis